The men's 10,000 metres at the 2017 World Championships in Athletics was held at the London Olympic Stadium on 4 August. This was billed to be the final 10,000 metres race of two-time champion Mo Farah. Farah won the race, ahead of Joshua Cheptegei from Uganda with Paul Tanui of Kenya finishing third. The win was Farah's third consecutive World 10,000 metres title, and his fifth consecutive major (Olympic or world) 10,000 metres title.

Summary
Joshua Cheptegei, Geoffrey Kipsang Kamworor and Moses Kurong formed an early breakaway, Kurong taking the lead for a few laps before Cheptegei went back to the front, and nine laps into the race, Kamworor, and then Paul Tanui, took the lead. By 6,000 metres, there was a lead group of 14 runners at the front, but this group gradually got smaller. Farah hit the front just before four laps to go. He let Abadi Hadis resume the lead, and at one point Kamworor had his heels caught by Farah as he cut across in front. Just before two laps to go, Farah went back into the lead.

During the penultimate turn, Tanui clipped the back of Farah's heels causing him to briefly lose his stride. Tanui sprinted through the final turn trying to get even with Farah at the head of the final straight. Farah turned to look at him, then accelerated away, already celebrating his win with ten metres remaining. Cheptegei sprinted around Tanui, but could not catch Farah and took second.

Records
Before the competition records were as follows:

The following records were set at the competition:

Qualification standard
The standard to qualify automatically for entry was 27:45.00.

Results
The final took place on 4 August at 21:20. The results were as follows (photo finish):

References

10,000
10,000 metres at the World Athletics Championships